Laklar may refer to:
 Laklar, Hashtrud
 Laklar, Malekan